is an anime series by Nippon Animation, directed by Yoshio Kuroda, which first aired in Japan on Fuji Television between January 15, 1989, and December 24, 1989, and It is also popular in the United Kingdom.

Outline
An adaptation of the classic Peter Pan play and novel by James Matthew Barrie, the series spanned a total of 41 episodes. It was scheduled to start on 8 January 1989, but due to the death of Emperor Shōwa, the premiere got postponed for a week.

It was part of the World Masterpiece Theater, a famed animation staple by Nippon Animation, which produced an animated version of a different classical book or story each year. The anime, while adapting material from the original novel, also adds numerous original story arcs.

In the usual case of the World Masterpiece Theater, the stage is a real world, and the main character is often exposed to terrible circumstances such as "single-parent family" or "orphan", and it tends to have a gloomy atmosphere. However, this work is a rare case, the stage is a fictional world, and although it is a story of adventure and battle, it has a bright atmosphere. Compared to other series in the franchise, the story is loosely adapted from the book, adding an entirely original second act focused on the new character of Princess Luna. The series is also notable for the presence of Rascal from Rascal the Raccoon, making it the only anime in the World Masterpiece Theater to contain a crossover.

The series was also later translated and released by Saban Entertainment in several international audiences worldwide in 1990, sometimes under the name Peter Pan: The Animated Series. In Europe, it was broadcast on the television networks: Telecinco (Spain), SIC (Portugal), RTL Television (Germany), KiKA (Germany), Italia 1, Canale 5 and Rete 4 (Italy), TV3 (Sweden) and Fox Kids (Sweden, Norway), REN TV (Russia), Yleisradio (Finland) and TVP 2 (Poland). It also aired in numerous other countries, such as New Zealand (TV2), Israel (on IETV and Fox Kids), Brazil (Rede Globo), Mexico (XHGC), Philippines (ABS-CBN), Sky One's Fun Factory (United Kingdom) and the From 2009 to 2012 Indonesia (Spacetoon).

Plot
The anime starts with Wendy having a dream about Peter Pan rescuing her and having a sword fight with Captain Hook. Wendy and her two brothers, later on in the episode, go to Never Neverland and Wendy becomes the 'mother' of the Lost boys. Throughout the series, a romance blooms between Peter and Wendy, as they go on fights with pirates.

The last half of the series deviates from the original story line, in a total of three camps (Peter Pan, Captain Hook and Sinistra). Two new characters (Sinistra and Luna) become an important part of the last episodes.

Different from Disney studios, the everyday wear of Peter Pan is brown in this work.

Characters

Peter Pan's side (main quartet) 
 : 
 The hero of this anime. He is a short-tempered but has a caring character and accepts what his friends say. He has the strong belief that he will not forgive anyone who violate freedom, and fights to keep Neverland a free and livable world.

 
 The oldest of three siblings who flies away  with Peter Pan (followed by her siblings). She is a feisty, kind, clever, jolly tomboy who is capable of helping her family and friends defy Hook's forces.

 : 
 Wendy's young brother, who is always getting into some kind of trouble.

 : 
Wendy's youngest brother, who shows a great deal of courage for his age.

Residents of the Neverland 
 : 
 A fairy and one of Peter's companions.

 : 
A lost boy, who is small and wears a pot on his head. While sleeping he always falls out of the bed.

 : 
One of the Lost Boys, who is very thick, wears a wide white coat and a white cap with rabbit ears hanging down and is an inventor.

 : 
One of the Lost Boys. He is tall but the most gloomy boy in Peter Pan's camp. He accidentally shoots Wendy down when Tink tricks him into shooting her.

 : 
 A tomboyish Indian princess that John starts to fall in love with.

When Peter fought Hook long ago, this crocodile ate Hook's right hand. Ever since then, he's been trying to eat the rest of him. This croc also happened to had swallowed a clock, which is the cause of the ticking sound that accompanies him.

 A Raccoon who often visits Peter Pan's House.

 They are friends of Peter Pan.

Captain Hook's side 
 : 
 The first villain, and leader of the pirates, who tries his hardest to defeat Peter Pan. He doesn't have his right hand. Although he is the captain, he is a pretty clumsy person.

 : 
An old pirate that serves under Captain Hook, but is too kind to be a pirate, he is Hook's main helper.

 : 
He is also a pirate and one of the strongest.

 
 The leader of the pirates when Hook is not around. He keeps many knives in his hat.

 : 
 Another one of Captain Hook's pirates. He wears an eyepatch, suggesting that he lost an eye at some point.

 : 
A cowardly pirate.

 : 
Pirate in charge of Hook's artillery.

Sinistra's side 
 (European version) : 
The evil queen of darkness, who serves as the main antagonist later on in the series. She is a witch who attempts to extinguish freedom from Neverland, regard both Peter Pan and Captain Hook as enemies. She has three henchmen that help her.

 : 
 A powerful Princess of Light, with a dark and powerful alter-ego.

Staff
 Director : Yoshio Kuroda
 Scenario : Michiru Shimada, Shun'ichi Yukimuro
 Character design : Takashi Nakamura
 Music : Toshiyuki Watanabe
 Sound director : Etsuji Yamada
 Animation director : Hirotsugu Kawasaki, Hirokazu Ishiyuki, Tomihiko Ōkubo, Megumi Kagawa, Kazushige Yusa, Hiroyuki Okiura, Moriyasu Taniguchi
 Art director : Masamichi Takano
 Producer : Shigeo Endō (Nippon Animation), Yoshihisa Tachikawa (Fuji Television)
 Planning : Shōji Satō (Nippon Animation), Kenji Shimizu (Fuji Television)
 Production management : Mitsuru Takakuwa, Junzō Nakajima (Nippon Animation)
 Production desk : Shun'ichi Kosao, Yasunori Tsukamoto (Nippon Animation)

Theme songs
 Opening theme : 
 Ending theme : 
(Both theme songs)
 Singer : Yukiko Iwai (Yūyu)
 Lyricist : Yasushi Akimoto
 Composer : Yoshimasa Inoue
 Arranger : Akira Nishihira

Since 1986, the singer of the theme song of the "World Masterpiece Theater" series has usually appeared in the main story (dubbing voice) or musical. However, Yukiko Iwai who sang theme songs of this work, did not appear in both the main story and musical.

Episodes

Development
Preview summaries character designs and pictures of the Peter Pan were released in magazines to promote the series. The character designs were slightly different from when the series aired. The story summary had a plot of Peter Pan and his friends stealing a treasure map from the pirates and went on a journey to find it.

Differences
Differences from the book or other Peter Pan versions: 
 In all the other versions Peter has a dagger, always worn close to himself to be ready for a duel all the time. In "The Adventures of Peter Pan" Peter uses a big scarf tooth for his fights. 
 In the book and most of the other versions the Darling children leave their home and go to Neverland in their pyjamas (Walt Disney's Peter Pan, Peter Pan (2003), Peter Pan Live! or Burbank Films Australia's Peter Pan). Here they first are wearing pyjamas when Peter visits them at night, but before leaving they change and are with their normal all day clothes in Neverland (as in some other versions like Fox's Peter Pan & the Pirates or The New Adventures of Peter Pan).  
 In the book and other versions there is only one clock in Neverland – the one inside the croc. But here in episode 08 "The Clock" it is shown that Hook also possesses another one on his ship. 
 In the book (and the movie Peter Pan (2003) and Peter Pan Live!) at the end of the story it is also the end of Hook, who gets eaten by the crocodile, but here he doesn't die. 
 In the book and other versions (Walt Disney's Peter Pan, Peter Pan (2003), Peter Pan Live!, Burbank Films Australia's Peter Pan or Fox's Peter Pan & the Pirates) Peter and the others have their home in an underground house and as the name says they live under the earth. Here they first have a tree house and live over the ground and later change it into a moving house on wheels. 
 In the book (and Fox's Peter Pan and the Pirates) the Lost Boys and John Darling share a big bed and Michael as being the smallest of them has his own bed, which is a big basket. In "The Adventures of Peter Pan" (or  Peter Pan Live!) everybody has his own bed. 
 In Barrie's novel (and the movies Peter Pan (2003) or Burbank Films Australia's Peter Pan) Peter and the boys build an extra house for Wendy, where only she lives and then regularly spends her time at the underground house. In this version (like in Peter Pan Live!) Wendy doesn't have her own house and lives in the same one as Peter and the others. 
 In the book and most of the other versions (Walt Disney's Peter Pan, Peter Pan (2003), Burbank Films Australia's Peter Pan or Fox's Peter Pan & the Pirates) the gang of the Lost Boys includes six boys. But here there are only three. 
 At the end of the novel and some other versions (like Peter Pan (2003) or Peter Pan Live!) the Lost Boys leave Neverland, get adopted by the Darling family and grow up. But here they stay in Neverland and after Peter returns to Wendy's house and finds out she's grown up and has a daughter the boys still are children. 
 At the end of the last chapter from Barrie's novel Peter after several years visits the Darling house again and meets the grown-up Wendy (and this is presented in Peter Pan Live!). In this version when Peter returns to London the adult Wendy is not at home, but only her daughter Jane, who explains to Peter that Wendy has grown up. 
 At the end of Barrie's story when Peter visits Wendy in London his little fairy Tinker Bell is already dead, but in The Adventures of Peter Pan (or Disney's Return to Neverland) when Wendy is an adult Tink is still alive and comes together with Peter to the Darling house. 
 Although the original Japanese script makes no reference to the crocodile's gender, the English translation of this series refers to the crocodile as "he." In The Pirate Fairy, the crocodile of the Disney version is referred to as "he," and the crocodile in the Burbank Films Australia film Peter Pan is also described as male. However, in Barrie's original, the crocodile is described as female. This is followed by the animated television series Fox's Peter Pan & the Pirates and the authorized sequel novel, Peter Pan in Scarlet.

Notes and references

External links

Nippon Animation : the outline of "the Adventures of Peter Pan"

See also

 Peter Pan : Produced by Disney Studios. Peter Pan's everyday wear is green.
 Peter Pan (1954 musical) : Jerome Robbins' musical. Also in this work, Peter Pan's everyday wear is green.
 Moero! Top Striker : An anime of overseas football, produced by many of the staff of this work. Broadcast in 1991.
 High School! Kimengumi : A school comedy in which Yukiko Iwai, who sings the theme song of this work, sang the theme song when she was enrolled in the Onyanko Club. Broadcast in 1985.

Peter Pan television series
1989 anime television series debuts
Japanese children's animated adventure television series
Japanese children's animated fantasy television series
Adventure anime and manga
Fantasy anime and manga
Pirates in anime and manga
Television shows based on children's books
Sky UK original programming
Television series by Saban Entertainment
World Masterpiece Theater series
Television shows set in London
Fox Kids
Television series about pirates